Urethral hypermobility is a condition of excessive movement of the female urethra due to a weakened urogenital diaphragm. It describes the instability of the urethra in relation to the pelvic floor muscles. A weakened pelvic floor muscle fails to adequately close the urethra and hence can cause stress urinary incontinence. This condition can be measured with anterior compartment descent. It is sometimes treated with urethral bulking injections.

References 

Urology
Incontinence